Lyria cloveriana is a species of sea snail, a marine gastropod mollusk in the family Volutidae, the volutes.

Subspecies 
 Lyria cloveriana gabryae Poppe, 1991 (occurs off Sri Lanka)

Description

Distribution

References

 Poppe, G., 1992. New species and a new subspecies in Volutidae (Mollusca:Gastropoda). Malacologia Mostra Mondiale 11: 3-21

External links
 MNHN, Paris: Lyria cloveriana gabryae (holotype)

Volutidae
Gastropods described in 1963